The Antonio Locatelli hut (German: Dreizinnenhütte) is a refuge located in the Tre Cime Natural Park in Alto Adige-South Tyrol at an altitude of 2,450 m.

Toponymy 

The refuge is named after Antonio Locatelli, who was born in Bergamo on April 17, 1895, and died on June 27, 1936, in the Lechemti massacre during the Ethiopian War. He was a highly decorated aviator (the only Italian soldier to receive three gold medals for his military valor), journalist, Italian politician, mountaineer, CAI academic and, at his death, president of the CAI of Bergamo. During the First World War, he distinguished himself as a pilot of military aviation, and his daring exploits made him famous. He participated in the flight over Vienna with D'Annunzio. Shot and captured on September 15, 1918, he managed to escape disguised as an Austrian soldier after a few weeks. Inside the shelter is a statue of the Virgin of Loreto, patron of the airmen.

History 

In 1881, the owner of the Post Hotel in Sexten, Karl Stemberger, proposed to build a refuge for the Deutscher und Österreichischer Alpenverein, the Austrian-German Alpine Club, near the Toblin pass. Members of the entire section of the club were enthusiastic about the panorama that can be enjoyed on the Tre Cime di Lavaredo, on Mount Paterno, and on the surrounding mountains, and decided to build the shelter to the pass.

Karl Stemberger managed the work, while the project was carried out by the president of the section, engineer Rienzner from Toblach. The work began in the spring of 1882. In two months, the equipment was available, and a simple one-storey building was installed, built with cut stones and a sloping roof. On the ground floor, the small shelter included an equipped room, an integrated kitchen, two tables, benches and chairs. Next to it was a door that led to a second room that served as a bed for the shepherds. On the east side, there was an outside staircase leading to the attic, which contained up to ten beds.

The shelter was to be open for autumn, but the weather was not favorable. In fact, in September 1882, a flood occurred in the upper Puster Valley. The inauguration was then postponed to 1883. For its realization, 1,250 florins were spent.

The refuge was destroyed during the First World War by an Italian grenade.

In 1922, a small refuge was rebuilt in place of the previous by the South Tyrol Alpine Club. In 1923, the refuge was expropriated in favor of the CAI section of Padua, which planned a major restoration and expansion in 1935.

The new shelter was not renovated but was built in a slightly different position. A simple monument built on an edge of the former visible location recalls the previous structure. It also receives the complementary name of Sepp Innerkofler, a mountain guide in the Dolomites.

At the refuge is a small chapel and two small lakes: the Piani lakes.

Access 
The Locatelli refuge can be reached from the Auronzo refuge, connected to Misurina (a hamlet of Auronzo) by a toll road. The minimum walking time required to reach the Locatelli refuge from the Auronzo refuge (car park) is approximately 1h 20 '. The connection with Sexten via the Fischlein Valley is more demanding. It can also be reached from Lake Landro in three hours.

References 

South Tyrol
Buildings and structures completed in 1882
Mountain huts in Trentino-Alto Adige/Südtirol
19th-century architecture in Italy